Anrukinzumab (IMA-638) is a humanized monoclonal antibody designed for the treatment of asthma.

Anrukinzumab was developed by Wyeth.

References 

Wyeth brands
Abandoned drugs